The Szelim cave (Hungarian: Szelim-barlang or Szelim-lyuk (Szelim hole), Bánhidai nagy barlang (Bánhidian big cave), Eperjes-barlang, Szemi-luki, Szemi-lyuka, Szelimluk barlang, Bánhidai-zsomboly, Szent Vit-barlang) is located in northwestern Hungary at the western margin of the
The site has been regularly frequented and used as a shelter by local villagers over the centuries, is easily accessible and its huge rectangular entrance features a memorial of the Turul.

Geology
The karstic cave was formed during the Upper Trias, has undergone and will further undergo extensive corrosion. Meteoric water infiltrates the compact Mesozoic
limestone and is going to carve cavities into the bedrock, solve the limestone and abrade the cavities with the debris and rocks.

Excavations
The cave was recognized as an archaeological site only relatively late. In 1932 Hubert Kessler, the first promoter of speleological research, began excavations. The results of Kessler work encouraged István Gaál to start regular excavations. In 1934 the Natural History Research Council supplied - although insufficient - the financial means for further work. Remains of hearths, stoves, carvings, animal bones and human remains, some of which date to the era of Turkish invasions in early modernity were excavated.

More recent research results confirm the notion that human occupation in Szelim dates back as far as 200,000 years BP. Mousterian artefacts and stone tools discovered in the stratae date back to the Upper Paleolithic.

In 2013 the Hungarian Ministry of Interior declared the site a protected natural national asset.

Legends of the cave
The cave is subject to several historical legends.
 According to the oral tradition the population of 7 neighboring villages escaped to the depth of the earth during the Turkish wars from Szelim sultan's troops who devastated Transdanubia. Unfortunately, Turkish found the people who hid in the cave and they killed them by the smoke of the bonfire they pour to the opening of the cave.
 The population of the villages surrounding the refuge being looked for in the cave on the time of the Tartar attacks. When a little boy got thirsty then aloud started crying, his mother took it away the close to a source. The Tartars, who had the woman compelled to reveal the cache of the others, captured them however there.

Pictures

References

External links
 Pictures of Szelim cave

Tatabánya
Caves of Hungary
Show caves in Hungary
Geography of Komárom-Esztergom County
Tourist attractions in Komárom-Esztergom County
Archaeological sites in Hungary